The Meek Building, also known as the Hogg Building, is a historic commercial building at Main and Oak Streets in Leslie, Arkansas.  It is a two-story brick building, with a flat roof obscured by a parapet.  Its main entrance is in an angled section at the street corner, with a second store entrance facing Oak Street.  Built about 1907, it is one of the oldest commercial buildings in the city, and has long been a local landmark, first housing the grocery of Roy Meek and then the meat shop of G. W. Hogg.

The building was listed on the National Register of Historic Places in 2000.

See also
National Register of Historic Places listings in Searcy County, Arkansas

References

Commercial buildings on the National Register of Historic Places in Arkansas
Buildings designated early commercial in the National Register of Historic Places in Arkansas
Buildings and structures completed in 1907
Buildings and structures in Searcy County, Arkansas
National Register of Historic Places in Searcy County, Arkansas
Historic district contributing properties in Arkansas